Victor Niño Corredor (born 4 June 1973 in Paipa, Boyacá) is a Colombian professional racing cyclist. He was nicknamed "La Chicharra" during his career.

Major results

1998
 1st Stage 5 Vuelta a Guatemala
 2nd Overall Vuelta Ciclista a Costa Rica
1999
 9th Overall Vuelta a Colombia
2001
 1st Mountains classification Vuelta a Colombia
 7th Overall Clásico RCN
2002
 1st Stage 2 Vuelta al Tolima
 5th Overall Clásico RCN
2003
 3rd Overall Vuelta al Tolima
2004
 1st Overall Vuelta a Boyacá
 1st Overall Clásica de la Consolación
 1st Stage 4 Vuelta al Tolima
 1st Stage 2 Vuelta a Antioquia
 6th Overall Vuelta a Venezuela
 9th Overall Vuelta Ciclista a Costa Rica
1st Stage 11
2005
 1st Overall Clasica del Meta
 1st Stage 12 Vuelta a Colombia
 6th Overall Doble Copacabana Grand Prix Fides
1st Stage 3 (TTT)
 6th Overall Clásico RCN
2006
 1st Stage 2 Doble Sucre Potosí GP Cemento Fancesa
 3rd Overall Clásica Nacional Ciudad de Anapoima
 8th Overall Doble Copacabana Grand Prix Fides
2007
 1st Stage 4 Doble Sucre Potosí GP Cemento Fancesa
 3rd Overall Clásica Ciudad de Girardot
 4th Overall Doble Copacabana Grand Prix Fides
 8th Overall Vuelta a Colombia
2008
 2nd Overall Clasica Alcaldía de Pasca
1st Prologue
 2nd Overall Vuelta a Boyacà
1st Stage 6
 4th Overall Clásico RCN
 6th Overall Vuelta a Colombia
2009
 3rd Overall Doble Sucre Potosí GP Cemento Fancesa
 3rd Overall Vuelta Ciclista Chiapas
 5th Overall Vuelta a Bolivia
 6th Overall Vuelta a la Independencia Nacional
1st Stage 4
 9th Overall Clásico RCN
2010
 4th Overall Vuelta Mexico Telmex
 5th Overall Clásica Ciudad de Girardot
 6th Overall Doble Sucre Potosí GP Cemento Fancesa
 9th Overall Clásico RCN
2011
 1st Overall Vuelta a Boyacà
1st Stage 4
 3rd Overall Vuelta a Cundinamarca
 4th Overall Vuelta a Bolivia
 5th Overall Clásica Club Deportivo Boyacá
 6th Overall Vuelta a Colombia
 6th Overall Vuelta Ciclista Chiapas
1st Stage 4
2012
 3rd Overall Tour de Langkawi
 5th Overall Vuelta a Colombia
 8th Overall Tour de Taiwan
1st Stage 6
2014
 1st  Mountains classification Tour of China I
 10th Overall Tour of Fuzhou
2015
 9th Overall Vuelta a Guatemala
2016
 10th Overall Tour of Fuzhou
2017
 2nd Overall Jelajah Malaysia
 3rd Overall Tour de Ijen
 8th Overall Tour de Singkarak
2018
 8th Overall Tour de Lombok Mandalika

References

External links

1973 births
Living people
People from Paipa
Colombian male cyclists
Sportspeople from Boyacá Department
21st-century Colombian people